Ruth "Dusty" Anderson (1916 or 1917 – September 12, 2007) was an American actress and model who worked in the 1940s. She was a World War II pin-up model and appeared in the Yank magazine.

Career
Anderson was born in Toledo, Ohio, United States. began her career as a model and made her film debut in a minor role as one of the cover girls in the 1944 Columbia Pictures production of Cover Girl starring Rita Hayworth. Over the next three years Anderson appeared in another eight films, usually in secondary roles. During World War II, she was one of a number of actresses who became a pin-up girl, appearing in the October 27, 1944, issue of the United States Military's YANK magazine. Anderson was featured in the mystery films Crime Doctor's Warning (1945), which was one in the popular Crime Doctor series, and The Phantom Thief (1946), from the Boston Blackie crime series films.

Personal life
Anderson was married twice and has two children. On July 18, 1941, she married Charles Mathieu, Jr., a United States Marine Corps Captain. They divorced on June 13, 1945. On July 21, 1946, Anderson married director Jean Negulesco in West Los Angeles, California, and retired from acting. Four years later, her final screen work was an uncredited role in one of her husband's films. In 1971, Anderson and Negulesco settled in Paris in retirement. Anderson died in Marbella, Spain on September 12, 2007, and was buried within the city, at the Cementerio Virgen del Carmen.

Selected filmography
 Tonight and Every Night (1945)
 Crime Doctor's Warning (1945)
 The Phantom Thief (1946)
 Singing on the Trail (1946)

References

External links

 Dusty Anderson at the American Film Institute
 Glamour Girls of the Silverscreen
Dusty Anderson – the life of a starlet at aenigma

2007 deaths
20th-century American actresses
Actresses from Toledo, Ohio
American film actresses
21st-century American women